Brisbane Phoenix Football Club is a football (soccer) club located in the Australian city of Brisbane, Queensland.

History
The club was formed as a junior team by a group of disgruntled Brisbane Lions members, mostly British immigrants, and was originally known as Inala City Soccer Club. They adopted the colours of Crystal Palace F.C. (maroon, sky-blue and white) and played their first year at the fields of the Darra United Soccer Club. A bond of friendship was formed between the two clubs. In 1973, Inala City was offered their own fields at Freeman Road, Richlands.

In 1979, Inala City expanded to form a senior club, absorbing some of its own juniors who had progressed. The club was placed in Brisbane's Division 3 and appears to have replaced the Inala Rangers club in this division. In their first season, the senior club was led by Matt Jackson to a grand final win and a victory in the Qantas Cup, a cup competition for clubs outside the Brisbane League's top two divisions. They continued to achieve well through the early to mid-1980s and the grounds were improved. In 1987, Prime Minister Bob Hawke opened a new clubhouse extension, which allowed the club to host many social functions.

In 1992 the club finished top of Division Two was promoted to the Brisbane Premier League for the 1993 season but struggled to compete at this level and was relegated the same year. Thereafter, it floated between Division 1 and Division 2.

As with many clubs at this time, Inala City's membership and volunteer numbers declined somewhat. The club attracted a new management and coaching team in 2003, changed its name to Brisbane Force Soccer Club and started a rebuilding program. In 2005 they merged with Darra United. Darra United had its own distinguished history, having won four league titles and three grand finals during the 30 seasons prior to the amalgamation.

Brisbane Force won three grand finals in four seasons between 2004 and 2007, including a 2–0 win against Beenleigh in the 2007 Premier Division 1 grand final.

After a reorganisation of the competition structure by Football Brisbane, Brisbane Force was elevated to the Brisbane Premier League for the 2013 season. The club managed to finish 10th out of 12 clubs in its first season, but finished in 11th place in 2014 and was relegated. After failing to complete its fixtures in the 2015 Capital League 1 season, the club dropped to Capital League 2 for 2016, but managed to finish in 4th place and qualify for the final series.

On 3 March 2017 the club president announced at the Annual General Meeting held the night before that the club's name was changed to Brisbane Phoenix Football Club.

On 7 December 2017 Brisbane Phoenix advised Football Brisbane that they will be withdrawing from all 2018 competitions, which includes both junior and senior competitions.

Recent Seasons

1 Withdrew from 2015 season after 14 matches. Results from their first 11 rounds stood, subsequent round results were annulled.
Source:

The tier is the level in the Australian soccer league system. Tiers were adjusted when the Qld State League commenced in 2008.

Honours
Due to frequent restructures and re-classifications of divisions in Brisbane football, the honours below list the tier in the Brisbane football pyramid.

Brisbane Phoenix/Brisbane Force
Premier Division 2 (Tier 3) – Grand Final winner 2004
Premier Division 2 (Tier 3) – Premiers and Grand Final winner 2005
Premier Division 1 (Tier 2) – Grand Final winner 2007

Inala City
Brisbane Division 3 (Tier 3) – Grand Final winner 1979
Qantas Cup (Tier 3 and below) – Cup Final winner 1979
Brisbane Division 2 (Tier 4) – Premiers 1985
Brisbane Division 2 (Tier 2) – Premiers 1992
Brisbane Division 1 (Tier 3) – Premiers 2001

Darra United
Brisbane Division 3 (Tier 3) – Premiers and Grand Final winner 1977
Brisbane Division 4 (Tier 4) – Premiers and Grand Final winner 1988
Brisbane Division 1 (Tier 3) – Premiers and Champions 2000
Metro League Division 1 (Tier 4) – Premiers and Grand Final winner 2004

Club captains
 2016–2017: Christopher Parsons
 2011–2015: Daniel Connor
 2010: Dave Maclot
 2006–2009: Roger Hunter
 2004–2006: Andrej Gaseca

Current squad
 Brody Sams
 Zac Foy
 Ben Taylor
 James Bell
 Roger Hunter
 Takumi Imamura
 Jeye Comerford
 Dave Maclot
 Pat McCarthy
 Daniel Connor
 Ben Clarke
 Adam Whitby
 Jesse Devereaux
 Radha Amaro
 Dylan Sinclair
 Mario Perkic
 Brent Woodley
 Matt Spall
 Trent Freeman
 Kenan Koldzo
 Dominic Robert

References

External links
 Brisbane Phoenix FC Official Website

Soccer clubs in Brisbane
Brisbane Premier League teams
Association football clubs established in 1972
1972 establishments in Australia